"Hey Now" is a song performed by French DJ and record producer Martin Solveig and The Cataracs, featuring American rapper Kyle. The song was released in France as a digital download on 27 May 2013. The song has charted in eight countries in Europe in 2013.

Music video
A music video to accompany the release of "Hey Now" was first released onto YouTube with a total length of 3 minutes.

Track listing

Charts

Weekly charts

Year-end charts

Certifications

Release history

References

External links

2013 singles
2013 songs
Martin Solveig songs
Big Beat Records (American record label) singles
Song recordings produced by the Cataracs
Songs written by Kshmr
Songs written by Martin Solveig